Westerhout 5 (Sharpless 2-199, LBN 667, Soul Nebula) is an emission nebula located in Cassiopeia. Several small open clusters are embedded in the nebula: CR 34, 632, and 634 (in the head) and IC 1848 (in the body). The object is more commonly called by the cluster designation IC 1848.

Small emission nebula IC 1871 is present just left of the top of the head, and small emission nebulae 670 and 669 are just below the lower back area.

The galaxies Maffei 1 and Maffei 2 are both nearby the nebula, although light extinction from the Milky Way makes them very hard to see.
Once thought to be part of the Local Group, they are now known to belong to their own group- the IC 342/Maffei Group.

This complex is the eastern neighbor of IC1805 (Heart Nebula) and the two are often mentioned together as the "Heart and Soul".

Star formation

W5, a radio source within the nebula, spans an area of sky equivalent to four full moons and is about 6,500 light-years away in the constellation Cassiopeia. Like other massive star-forming regions, such as Orion and Carina, W5 contains large cavities that were carved out by radiation and winds from the region's most massive stars. According to the theory of triggered star formation, the carving out of these cavities pushes gas together, causing it to ignite into successive generations of new stars. The image in the gallery above contains some of the best evidence yet for the triggered star formation theory. Scientists analyzing the photo have been able to show that the ages of the stars become progressively and systematically younger with distance from the center of the cavities.

References

H II regions
Astronomical radio sources
Sharpless objects
Articles containing video clips
Cassiopeia (constellation)
Emission nebulae
IC objects
Star-forming regions